De mi corazón al aire is the first studio album of Vicente Amigo.

Track listing
"De mi corazón al aire" – 3:41
"Reino de Silia" – 4:16
"Gitano de Lucía” – 3:47
"Morente" – 4:04
"Maestro Sanlúcar" – 3:49
"Callejón de la luna" – 5:55
"Morao" – 4:54
"Tío Arango" – 4:44

Musicians
Vicente Amigo – Flamenco guitar

1991 albums
Vicente Amigo albums